Pinehouse Lake is a lake in northern Saskatchewan, Canada. The northern village of Pinehouse is located on the western shore.

The Churchill River flows in from Sandy Lake into the north-west end of the lake at McDonald Bay and flows out through the north-east end of the lake into Sandfly Lake.

See also
List of lakes of Saskatchewan

References

Statistics Canada
Anglersatlas.com

Lakes of Saskatchewan